Scott Merrill is an American architect. He is a principal at Merrill, Pastor & Colgan Architects. He was the recipient of the Driehaus Prize in 2016. He has designed many of the buildings in Seaside, Florida, including the "Honeymoon Cottages" project for which he won an AIA national design award in 1991, and he has worked with Leon Krier.

External links
Geoffrey Baer, Architect Scott Merrill: The Power of Simplicity, WTTW, March 17, 2016 (video)

References

20th-century American architects
21st-century American architects
New Classical architects
Living people
University of Virginia alumni
Yale School of Architecture alumni
Year of birth missing (living people)